The Washington Court of Appeals is the intermediate level appellate court for the state of Washington. The court is divided into three divisions. Division I is based in Seattle, Division II is based in Tacoma, and Division III is based in Spokane.

History
As early as 1929, the Washington judiciary observed a need for an intermediate appellate court to relieve the heavy workload of the Washington Supreme Court. That year the state's Judicial Council suggested the establishment of such a court as a possible option for judicial restructuring. Nevertheless, the state legislature took no steps until the mid-1960s, when work began on a Court of Appeals.

The Washington citizenry adopted a Constitutional Amendment on November 5, 1968, which authorized the legislature to create a Court of Appeals and to define its composition and jurisdiction. On May 12, 1969, the legislature passed the enabling act that established a Court of Appeals with three divisions and a total of twelve judges. Governor Dan Evans appointed the initial twelve judges with the judges all facing election at the general election of 1970 and with each elected judge initially serving terms of two, four or six years determined by lot.

Composition

Twenty-two judges currently sit on the Washington Court of Appeals Court, divided into three geographic divisions. Within each division, panels of three judges hear each appeal. The court never sits en banc. Voters elect Court of Appeals judges for six-year terms. Judges on the Court of Appeals, like other Washington jurists, must retire at the end of the calendar year they reach the age of 75. Each division contains three electoral districts, with judges within the divisions being elected only from within those districts.

Jurisdiction

By statute, the court is empowered to hear the following types of cases:
1. As a matter of right, all appeals from final judgments' of the Superior Court, and all other orders that effectively cut-off further litigation, such as condemnation orders, termination of parental rights, juvenile court proceedings, and incompetency proceedings.

 All Personal Restraint Petitions (a statutory variation of the Writ of Habeas Corpus) 
 Writs of Mandamus and quo warranto (the Writ of Habeas Corpus is only available in Superior Court) 
 Appeals from decisions of administrative agencies.
 Discretionary Review of the Superior Court's decision in an appeal from a court of limited jurisdiction.
 Discretionary Review of interlocutory appeals from rulings of the Superior Court for which there is no other effective remedy.

Jurisdiction precluded (vested in the Supreme Court of Washington)

 Writs of quo warranto, prohibition, injunction or mandamus that are directed to state officials.
 Cases where the death penalty has been imposed.
 Cases where the validity of all or any part of a statute or tax has been held to violate the state constitution, the US Constitution or federal law.
 Cases involving fundamental and urgent issues of broad public import requiring prompt and ultimate determination.

Current judges

Divisions

Division I
Division I sits in Seattle, and is the smallest of the three geographic divisions, though the largest by population. It stretches from the White River (to the extent it serves at part of King county's southern boundary) in the south to the Canada–US border in the north, and from the Cascade Range in the east to the San Juan Islands in the west. The division hears appeals from Island, King, San Juan, Skagit, Snohomish and Whatcom.

Division II
Division II sits in Tacoma and hears appeals from the counties of Clallam, Clark, Cowlitz, Grays Harbor, Jefferson, Kitsap, Lewis, Mason, Pacific, Pierce, Skamania (see note, infra.), Thurston and Wahkiakum.

Division III
Division III sits in Spokane and includes the three-fifths of the state's land area that lies east of the Cascade Range. In addition to the state's second largest city, Spokane; it embraces the regional cities of Yakima and the Tri-Cities of Kennewick, Pasco, and Richland.
It hears appeals from Adams, Asotin, Benton, Chelan, Columbia, Douglas, Ferry, Franklin, Garfield, Grant, Kittitas, Klickitat (see note, infra.), Lincoln, Okanigan, Pend Oreille, Spokane, Stevens, Walla Walla, Whitman and Yakima counties.

Other areas 
Skamania County is in Division II; Klickitat County is in Division III. These counties are sparsely populated, so do not qualify for their own Superior Court judge. They must share one Superior Court Judge. When the judge presides in Skamania County, Division II opinions are followed. When the judge presides in Klickitat County, Division III opinions are followed. When the Divisions issue conflicting opinions, practitioners must be careful to follow/cite from the appropriate appellate division.

References

External links
 Washington State Trial and Appellate Courts homepage

Washington (state) state courts
State appellate courts of the United States
1969 establishments in Washington (state)
Courts and tribunals established in 1969